Legendre's conjecture, proposed by Adrien-Marie Legendre, states that there is a prime number between  and  for every positive integer .

Prime gaps
If Legendre's conjecture is true, the gap between any prime p and the next largest prime would be , as expressed in big O notation. It is one of a family of results and conjectures related to prime gaps, that is, to the spacing between prime numbers. If Cramér's conjecture is true, Legendre's conjecture would follow for all sufficiently large n.

Since this number is large for large , this lends credence to Legendre's conjecture. It is known that the prime number theorem gives an accurate count of the primes within short intervals, either unconditionally or based on the Riemann hypothesis, but the lengths of the intervals for which this has been proven are longer than the intervals between consecutive squares, too long to prove Legendre's conjecture.

Partial results

Baker, Harman and Pintz proved that there is a prime in the interval  for all large .

A table of maximal prime gaps shows that the conjecture holds to at least , meaning .

Notes

References

External links
 

Conjectures about prime numbers
Squares in number theory
Unsolved problems in number theory